Benjamin Charles Abbey (born 13 May 1978) is an English former footballer. He had spells in the Football League with Oxford United, Southend United and Macclesfield Town. Abbey has since moved on to forge a successful career in Finance and Sports Management.  

Abbey joined Division Two club Oxford United from Crawley Town in September 1999 for a fee of £30,000.

References

External links
Northwood F.C. profile

1978 births
Living people
Footballers from Greater London
English footballers
Maidenhead United F.C. players
Crawley Town F.C. players
Oxford United F.C. players
Aldershot Town F.C. players
Southend United F.C. players
Stevenage F.C. players
Woking F.C. players
Macclesfield Town F.C. players
Ebbsfleet United F.C. players
St Albans City F.C. players
Northwood F.C. players
English Football League players
National League (English football) players
Isthmian League players
Southern Football League players
Slough Town F.C. players
Tooting & Mitcham United F.C. players
Metropolitan Police F.C. players
Association football forwards